Macquarie Rivulet is a perennial river located in the Southern Highlands and Illawarra regions of New South Wales, Australia.

Location and features
Macquarie Rivulet rises within the Macquarie Pass National Park on the eastern slopes of the Illawarra escarpment and drains the eastern edge of the Southern Highlands plateau. The rivulet flows generally east by north before reaching its mouth within Lake Illawarra, east of the Shellharbour suburb of Yallah.

The Princes Highway crosses the Macquarie Rivulet at Yallah.

See also

 
 List of rivers of New South Wales (L–Z)
 Mount Murray 
 Rivers of New South Wales

References

External links
 

Rivers of New South Wales
Geography of Wollongong
Southern Highlands (New South Wales)